Keystone, Washington  may refer to:

Keystone, Adams County, Washington, an unincorporated community
Keystone, Island County, Washington an unincorporated community